William John Gray, 13th Lord Gray (1754–1807), was a Scottish nobleman and soldier.

He was the son of John Gray, 11th Lord Gray, and Margaret Blair. He served as a cornet in the 2nd Dragoons (Royal Scots Greys), and was made lieutenant in 1776. He was promoted to captain in the 15th Dragoons in 1779, and retired in 1788.

He succeeded his brother as Lord Gray in 1786. On 12 December 1807 he committed suicide at his home, Kinfauns Castle in Perthshire. His suicide is attributed to a love disappointment. He was unmarried, and was succeeded by his brother.

References

1754 births
1807 deaths
Royal Scots Greys officers
15th The King's Hussars officers
Suicides in Scotland
Lords Gray